Thrixopelma is a genus of South American tarantulas that was first described by Günter E. W. Schmidt in 1994. They are medium to large tarantulas, usually being 35mm to 60mm in body length.

Diagnosis 
Males can be distinguished by the presence of two crests in the palpal bulb. Females can be distinguished by the spermathecae, which is made up of two separate hypersclerotized receptacles. This genus also own type 3 urticating hairs, or both type 3 and 4.

Species
 it contains seven species, found in South America:
Thrixopelma aymara (Chamberlin, 1916) – Peru
Thrixopelma cyaneolum Schmidt, Friebolin & Friebolin, 2005 – Peru
Thrixopelma lagunas Schmidt & Rudloff, 2010 – Peru
Thrixopelma longicolli (Schmidt, 2003) – Ecuador, Peru
Thrixopelma nadineae Sherwood & Gabriel, 2022 - Ecuador
Thrixopelma ockerti Schmidt, 1994 (type) – Peru
Thrixopelma peruvianum (Schmidt, 2007) – Peru
Thrixopelma pruriens Schmidt, 1998 – Chile

See also
 List of Theraphosidae species

References

Theraphosidae genera
Theraphosidae